HELO or Helo may refer to:

People and characters
 Helô or Heloísa Pinheiro (born 1945), Brazilian model and businesswoman
 Johan Helo (1889–1966), Finnish lawyer, diplomat and politician
 Sattar Jabbar Hilo, Mandaean priest from Iraq
 Karl Agathon (call sign: "Helo"), character  in the 2004 Battlestar Galactica television series

Other uses
 helicopter (military clipping: helo)
 HELO, a Simple Mail Transfer Protocol command
 Huddersfield Experimental Laptop Orchestra, England
 Helo Cliffs, Ross Island, Antarctica

See also
 Hilo, the county seat of Hawaii County, Hawaii
 Hello (disambiguation)
 Halo (disambiguation)